The Cimarrones de Sonora Fútbol Club Premier play football in the Liga Premier in Hermosillo, Sonora, Mexico and are the official reserve team for Cimarrones de Sonora. The games are held in the city of Hermosillo in the Estadio Héroe de Nacozari.

Players

Current squad
.

References

Football clubs in Sonora
Liga Premier de México